Alexis Whitecourt 232 is an Indian reserve of the Alexis Nakota Sioux Nation in Alberta, located within Woodlands County. It is 13 kilometers northwest of Whitecourt.

References

Indian reserves in Alberta
Nakoda (Stoney)
Woodlands County